Vysheysha shkola is a state-owned publishing house in Minsk, Belarus, specialized in publishing academic books.

External links
 website of the publishing house

Companies with year of establishment missing
Publishing companies of Belarus
Mass media in Minsk
Publishing companies of the Soviet Union